Acrocercops orbifera is a moth of the family Gracillariidae, known from Tamil Nadu, India. It was described by Edward Meyrick in 1908.

References

orbifera
Moths of Asia
Moths described in 1908